The 1960–61 Austrian Hockey League season was the 31st season of the Austrian Hockey League, the top level of ice hockey in Austria. Six teams participated in the league, and EV Innsbruck won the championship.

Regular season

External links
Austrian Ice Hockey Association

Auser
Austrian Hockey League seasons
Aust